The following is a list of indoor arenas in Belgium, ordered by seating-only capacity.
The venues are by their final capacity after construction for seating-only and standing-only events.

Current arenas

See also 
List of indoor arenas in Europe
List of indoor arenas by capacity

References

 
Belgium
Indoor arenas